The Long Trial of Nolan Dugatti is a 2008 novel written by Native American author Stephen Graham Jones.

Plot summary

Characters

Motifs

2008 American novels
Novels by Stephen Graham Jones
Native American novels